Bangrabazar Thana is a thana of Muradnagar Upazila, Comilla District, Bangladesh.

History
The plan to set up a police station in Bangrabazar was confirmed in 2015, two years after Prime Minister Sheikh Hasina's announcement. One year after the confirmation, the operational activities of Bangarabazar police station started on 1 January.

Administrative areas 
Administrative activities of 10 unions of Muradnagar upazila are under Bangrabazar police station.

 Unions:
 No. 1 Srikail
 No. 2 Akubpur
 No. 3 Andikot No. 3
 No. 4 Purbadhair East
 No. 5 Purbadhair West
 No. 6 Bangra East
 No. 7 Bangra West
 No. 8 Chapitala
 No. 12 Ramchandrapur North
 No. 22 Tonki

References 

Thanas of Cumilla District
Muradnagar Upazila